Răzvan Cătălin Began (born 12 August 1996) is a Romanian professional footballer who plays as a goalkeeper for Liga I side Sepsi OSK.

Club career

Sepsi OSK

He made his Liga I debut for Sepsi OSK against Dinamo București on 31 October 2021.

Honours
Sepsi OSK 
Cupa României: 2021–22
Supercupa României: 2022

References

External links
 
 

1996 births
Living people
People from Sighetu Marmației
Romanian footballers
Romania youth international footballers
Association football goalkeepers
Liga I players
Liga II players
Liga III players
FC Hermannstadt players
ACS Poli Timișoara players
CFR Cluj players
FCV Farul Constanța players
ACS Foresta Suceava players
ASC Daco-Getica București players
Sepsi OSK Sfântu Gheorghe players
FC Dunărea Călărași players